The Winston Theatre is a traditional proscenium arch theatre located in the Bristol Students' Union building, one of the largest students' union buildings in Great Britain. The theatre seats 204, with 5 additional seats for the Front of House staff and 2 spaces for wheelchairs.

The Theatre boasts an ample orchestra pit, fly galleries with winchable lighting bars and versatile hemp bars, a large control room, an FOH sound location, two large dressing rooms, and a sliding scenery dock door at the rear of the stage (currently disused). The theatre is well equipped for a student theatre.

In April 2013 the theatre was temporarily closed for refurbishment as part of the wider refurbishment of the students' union building, and re-opened in February 2015.

History
The Winston Theatre was built in the 1960s as part of the Students' Union building on Queens Road in Clifton, Bristol. The Union moved to this new location in 1965 from the Victoria Rooms, as a larger premises due to the large expansion of the University and increase in undergraduate numbers.

Refurbishment
Between 2013 and 2015, as part of the renovation work to the Union building, the Winston theatre was refurbished. The Stage Technicians' Association (a student society which operates the theatre on a day-to-day basis on behalf of Bristol SU) worked closely with the Union, Galliford Try and Stage Electrics to design a space which was suitable for their current needs, and would also remain up to date as technology moved on.

Technical
 Total of 600A 3 Phase power to theatre
 200A 3 Phase feed for dimming circuits
 200A 3 Phase feed for technical power
 200A 3 Phase feed for audio circuits
 132 10A Dimmer channels (Zero 88 Chilli's)
 16 Relay channels (Fused at 10A, pair of 16A connectors per channel)
 3 Winched bars on stage (SWL: 150KG)
 Chain hoist bar on stage (SWL:250KG)
 Fixed grid above auditorium
 6 Front of house booms
 Patch panels available at most locations, all fed to a single rack. Panels may contain
 DMX
 XLR
 Ethernet
 BNC
 Speakon
 Intercom A/B

Notable events and productions
 The UK National Student Film Festival, Screentest. Created as a platform to showcase student filmmaking talent from around the UK, the awards ceremony has been held in the Winston Theatre in Bristol since 2004. Guests at the festival have included:
 BAFTA award winner Luis Cook
 Director Ken Loach
 Actress Emily Watson
 Screenwriter David Nicholls
 Chairman of BAFTA Duncan Kenworthy
 UK Film Council Chairman Stewart Till CBE
 The first UK amateur production of Footloose was performed by Music Theatre Bristol at the Winston Theatre in June 2009. The rights for the show have been released by Josef Weinberger.

See also
 University of Bristol Union
 University of Bristol
List of theatres in Bristol

References

Theatres in Bristol
University of Bristol